Just Charlie is the fifth studio album by American singer Charlie Wilson. It was released by Jive Records on December 3, 2010 in the United States. The album debuted and peaked at number 19 on the US Billboard 200 and at number 2 on the US Top R&B/Hip-Hop Albums chart, selling 57,286 copies in its first week. Fantasia is the only featured guest on Just Charlie, who appears on a remake of the Roger Troutman song, "I Want to Be Your Man".

The album also includes the hit single, "You Are", which earned Wilson a career high debut on the Billboard Hot R&B/Hip Hop Songs chart and topped the Billboard Urban Adult Contemporary Chart. "You Are" remained at number one for 13 weeks on the Billboard UAC Chart, climbing to number 16 on the Billboard Hot R&B/Hip-Hop Songs chart, number 7 on the Heatseeker Songs chart, number 19 on the Christian Songs chart, and number 64 on Radio Songs chart.

Track listing

Charts

Weekly charts

Year-end charts

Release history

References

External links
 

Charlie Wilson (singer) albums
2010 albums
Jive Records albums